Álvaro Guillermo Peña Peña (born 11 February 1965) is a Bolivian football manager and player who played as a striker. He is the current manager of Independiente Petrolero.

Playing career

Club
At club level he played for San José, where he was the Bolivian league topscorer in 1992. He played abroad with Deportes Temuco of Chile between 1993 and 1994 and for Cortuluá of Colombia in 1995.

His other clubs in Bolivia include Blooming, Oriente Petrolero, Bolívar, Destroyers, The Strongest and Mariscal Braun.

International
He played 43 international matches and scored 4 goals for the Bolivia national team He made one appearance in the 1994 FIFA World Cup and represented his country in 2 FIFA World Cup qualification matches.

Managerial career 
After retiring as a player, Peña took up coaching. He has served as the manager for Blooming, Oriente Petrolero and Destroyers. He is currently under contract with Ukrainian team Dinamo Kiev, where he is part of the youth sector's coaching staff.

Personal life
His younger brother José is also a football manager.

Honours

Individual 
 San José
 Liga de Fútbol Profesional Boliviano: 1992 Topscorer (32 goals)

References

External links 
 
 

1965 births
Living people
Sportspeople from Santa Cruz de la Sierra
Bolivian footballers
Bolivia international footballers
Association football forwards
1994 FIFA World Cup players
1989 Copa América players
1991 Copa América players
1993 Copa América players
1995 Copa América players
Club Blooming players
Club San José players
Deportes Temuco footballers
Cortuluá footballers
Club Bolívar players
Club Destroyers players
Oriente Petrolero players
The Strongest players
Bolivian expatriate footballers
Expatriate footballers in Chile
Expatriate footballers in Colombia
Categoría Primera A players
Chilean Primera División players
Bolivian Primera División players
Bolivian football managers
Oriente Petrolero managers
Club Destroyers managers
Club Blooming managers
Club Deportivo Guabirá managers
C.D. Real Tomayapo managers
C.D. Jorge Wilstermann managers
Nacional Potosí managers
Independiente Petrolero managers
Bolivian expatriate football managers
Expatriate football managers in Ukraine